Jack Schwartzman (July 22, 1932 – June 15, 1994) was an American film producer.

Early life
Jack Schwartzman was born on July 22, 1932, in New York City. He had a brother, Leonard Schwartzman, who became a physician.

Career
Schwartzman was an entertainment attorney (clients included director Hal Ashby) and in the late 1970s was an executive at Lorimar Films. Schwartzman later became a film producer; among the films he produced were the 1983 non-Eon James Bond film Never Say Never Again, starring Sean Connery and the 1986 film Rad, starring Bill Allen. His production company, Taliafilm, was named after second wife, actress Talia Shire.

In 1984, his Taliafilm company slates four pictures at the Producers Sales Organization, which will serve as financer and spent $80 million on making their own movies. In 1985, he set up his own film fund, Taliafilm II, with the three projects serving within the core Taliafilm II team were Rad, Hypersapien, and Lionheart: The Children's Crusade.

Personal life
Schwartzman and his first wife, Judith Deborah Feldman (m. February 5, 1958 – August 11, 1980; divorced) had two children, John Schwartzman and Stephanie. Schwartzman and his second wife, actress Talia Shire had two sons, Jason Schwartzman and Robert Coppola Schwartzman. Jack Schwartzman died of pancreatic cancer on June 15, 1994, in Los Angeles, California.

Schwartzman was Jewish.

See also
Coppola family tree

References

External links

1932 births
1994 deaths
American film producers
20th-century American Jews
Coppola family
Deaths from pancreatic cancer
Businesspeople from Los Angeles
Businesspeople from New York City
Deaths from cancer in California
20th-century American businesspeople